Blitzkrieg is a real-time tactics video game based on the events of World War II and is the first title in the Blitzkrieg series. The game allows players to assume the role of commanding officer during the battles of World War II that occurred in Europe and North Africa. Each country has its respective historically correct military units. Similar to the Sudden Strike games, Blitzkrieg focuses on battles rather than real-time strategy aspects like base building.

Virtual Programming published a Mac OS X version of the game on the Mac App Store on April 20, 2011.

Certain versions of the original game, and several sequels, use the StarForce copy protection system. Blitzkrieg Anthology does not appear to use StarForce.

Graphics deliver realistic 3-D rendered isometric terrain and details include seasons, climatic zones and weather conditions which can affect game play. Blood is present although it can be deactivated. The game features over 350 different units and objects. The player has the ability to build pontoon bridges, dig trenches, lay mines, resupply and repair units or call in air support but there are no resources. Virtually everything can be destroyed including buildings and bridges. Forests can be flattened by tanks or artillery. Each unit of a respective nation speaks its own language, adding immensely to the immersion.

The game shipped with a mission and resource editors for users to create their own units and maps.

Gameplay
The game is split into three modes: campaign, multiplayer and custom game. Blitzkrieg centers on 3 distinctive campaigns which features some of the major factions battling it out in World War II. They feature the Allies (American and British campaigns), the Germans, and the Soviets. Each of those attempt to chronologically re-enact the time periods of the war by devising Chapters into each of the campaigns.

Each player starts with 'core units'. These named units would be the same personnel accompanying the player throughout the chosen Campaign and may gain rank and experience as the player progresses from one Chapter to the other. As they fight, units will expend their ammunition, forcing the player to pay attention. Each of the individual units can be used separately or in groups, and by highlighting vehicles or humans, groups can be created and then called by a button at any time. Because of the dismissal of base-building and unit spawning, strategy is a key ingredient of overall gameplay.

Reception

Add-ons 
There are three official expansions of the original Blitzkrieg to date, all three were developed by La Plata Studios (Germany) in collaboration with Nival Interactive, the developer of the original Blitzkrieg game. They are published and distributed by CDV Interactive. The base game Blitzkrieg was released together with its three expansions as Blitzkrieg Anthology.

Blitzkrieg: Burning Horizon follows the footsteps of General Erwin Rommel starting from the crossing of the Ardennes to the battles of the Afrika Korps and continuing to the last struggle of German resistance in occupied France. It also includes a new nation, Japan, with unique new units and weaponry (Belgium is also added, in single player only as an enemy), as well as 8 brand new single player missions, in which battles rage in many different countries and islands, from the Pacific island of Papua New Guinea to the jungles of Burma and Singapore and the deserts of Northern Africa and much more. It also includes over 56 new and improved units, including tanks, aircraft, squads, and artillery. It was first released in Germany in April 2004, although a Finnish release may have come earlier. It was then sold in English-language and several other markets in June.
Blitzkrieg: Rolling Thunder traces the career of General George S. Patton during World War II ranging from the deserts of the North African campaign to the snowy forests of the Ardennes during the Battle of the Bulge. Rolling Thunder is also known as Roar of the Storm or Rumble of the Storm in the Russian market. It was first released in November 2004.
Blitzkrieg: Iron Division (also known as Green Devils), an expansion that requires Blitzkrieg and Rolling Thunder in order to play. The Green Devils add-on is also known as Devils in Khaki in the Russian market. Unlike the first two expansions, it is not a full campaign, but a set of 4 custom missions. It follows the German 9th Panzer Division's actions in the Battle of France, the Eastern Front and the Normandy campaign. It also includes Blitzkrieg's 1st airborne campaign called Eagles as well as a few new units and a new campaign: Tank School. First released in June 2005, it was sold in the US in September 2006.

Unofficial 
Unofficial add-ons in retail boxes/cases developed by INtex Publishing GmbH & Co. KG. INtex Publishing was also known for previously releasing several add-ons called Total War, II and Total Victory for the early Sudden Strike real-time strategy games between 2001 to 2002. The German developer built six different Total Challenge add-ons for the Blitzkrieg game, as well as the enhanced Director's Cut of the first two Total Challenge packs and several compilations. These Director's Cut editions improved upon the original with new textures, error corrections and some gameplay tweaks. Improvements of later editions in the Total Challenge series are also included such as improved line of sight and pathfinding. The series add-ons were released in Germany and sometimes in some other European markets, although, only the first Total Challenge title was released in retail form in English-language markets. These add-ons were titled in the Russian markets as Mortal Combat, accompanied by the instalment number (eg. Mortal Combat, Mortal Combat 2 to 5).

Total Challenge series 
Blitzkrieg: Total Challenge was released in the US in 2004. It was the only title in the series to be released in English markets. It is also known in German as Total Challenge: New missions for Blitzkrieg and Russian as Mortal Combat. The game may have been released early in Ukraine in May 2003 and in Europe later in 2003.
Total Challenge II: The Blitzkrieg add-on released in December 2003.
Total Challenge III: The Blitzkrieg add-on released in May 2004.
Total Challenge MP: The Blitzkrieg add-on released in June 2004. It is a multiplayer add-on for Blitzkrieg. It features all the extra units, textures and game improvements from Total Challenge 1, 2 and 3. New playable nations include France, Poland, Finland and Hungary. It comes with 21 multiplayer maps with historically correct locations from Africa, Europe and Russia.
Total Challenge Trilogie was released in 2004. It is a retail compilation including Total Challenge I, II and MP editions.
Total Challenge IV: The Blitzkrieg add-on released in September 2004.
Total Challenge V: The Blitzkrieg add-on released in February 2005.
Total Challenge Multipack released in May 2005. It is retail compilation including Total Challenge III, IV and MP editions.
Total Challenge: Director's Cut released in 2007.
Total Challenge II: Director's Cut released in 2007.

Unofficial add-ons were developed by Brendel Software-Systeme. The German developer has over 20 unofficial add-ons for the Blitzkrieg game at their web-store. They're usually in the German language only. The list below shows the English-translated titles.

Other titles 
Battle of Berlin, German-only disc pack released in 2010.
Battle of Berlin 2, German-only disc pack released in 2012.
Operation Nordwind, German-only disc pack released in 2014, also available digitally.
Panzeralarm, German-only disc pack released in 2010.
Schlachtfeld Europa, German-only disc pack released in 2009. English title is Battlefield Europe.
Total Mission 3: Die Grünen Teufel, German-only disc pack released in 2011. English title is Total Mission 3: The Green Devils.

Note: Not in any MobyGames listing
Blitzkrieg Veterans, German-only disc pack released in 2010. Contains two add-ons: Desert Fox & Burning Earth. With Desert Fox the players experience the struggle of the German Africa Corps in North Africa in five chapters with thirteen missions. The victorious advance begins at Marsa el Brega and Agedabia and takes you with the DAK across the Cyrenaica to the Halfaya Pass, in the Sollum battle, via the Blenheim Feste and Knightbridge Box to Tobruk. At El Alamein the tide turned in favor of the British, but General Ramke managed to successfully lead his paratrooper brigade out of the El Alamein battle. In Tunisia, Rommel's DAK faces the Allies again.
Burning Earth begins with the great summer battle of 1943. Operation Citadel begins on July 5, 1943 at 3:30 am. The summer battle of 1943 was to cut off the Kursk balcony with the 4th Panzer Army and Army Detachment Kempf from the south and the 9th Army from the north. In the north of the Kurskerbogen, Model 9th Army encounters a well-prepared resistance from the Soviets. The 23rd German Army Corps, which was shielding the left flank of the attack, lay in front of Maloarchangelsk. The tank corps cling to the heights near Olchowatka. In the south of the Kurskerbogen, the Army detachment Kempf crosses the Donets south of Bjelgorod. In the summer of 1943, the Soviets launched their great ovensive. In Burning Earth the players take part in the heavy retreat battles of Army Groups North, Middle and South.
Blitzkrieg Veterans 2, German-only disc pack released in 2011. Contains 2 add-ons: Leningrad Battle & Total Missions 2; plus bonus chapters: Heavy Tank Destroyer Division 653 & Brückenkopf Bukrin.
Leningrad Battle leads through four chapters and 18 missions through the front life of the German soldiers on the Eastern Front. The bonus chapter heavy tank department 503 contains 6 missions with the most important war operations of the department. In the bonus chapter 'Kurland-Kessel' the players take part with 3 missions in the events of the 1st battle of Kurland to 4th battle of Kurland.
Total Missions 2 is an 15-mission campaign set in Tunisia, the Eastern Front and France in Normandy with the 501 heavy tank division.
Heavy Tank Destroyer Division 653 is a German chapter set on March 31, 1943 near Leitha; November 1943 near the Nikopol bridgehead; then several companies of the division were deployed in Anzio, Italy. In October 1944, some companies took part in the Ardennes offensive; and by March 1945, the division was involved in fighting near Haguenau / Unterelsass.
Brückenkopf Bukrin is a German chapter set in and around Kiev during September 1943, with fighting taking place between Donets and Dnieper, and focuses on the 24th Panzer Corps.
Burning Earth 2, German-only disc pack released in 2010. Contains 26 epic German missions for Blitzkrieg, which begins with the fighting on the Eastern Front in Russia in July 1942 with the march to Stalingrad and continues with Army Group Don. The Army Group initially tried to relieve the 6th Army by attacking the siege ring by the 4th Panzer Army (Operation Wintergewitter). However, after Hitler forbade the 6th Army to break out of Stalingrad and the entire southern wing of the Eastern Front began to totter, the attempt at relief had to be abandoned around Christmas 1942. The battle continues with Operation Citadel. On July 5, 1943, the Wehrmacht began their last major offensive on the Eastern Front near Orel and Belgorod. The aim of Operation 'Citadel' against the 150-kilometer-long opposing front arch near Kursk was to enclose Soviet units with a pincer movement. The game ends with the beachhead of Nikopol in February 1944.

Web-store listings 
1st Panzer Division
1st Panzer Division II
16th Panzer Division
16th Panzer Division II
20th Mountain Army
6th Army
Army Group North
Battle of the Bulge 1944
Battle of the Lower Rhine
Battlefield Rhineland
Battlefield Russia
Battlefield Russia 2
Company Citadel
Division Grossdeutschland
Division Grossdeutschland 2
Italian campaign 1943-45
Kuban bridgehead
Normandy 1944
Operation North Wind
Panzer VI Tiger
Western Campaign 1940

Stand-alone games 
Stalingrad, developed by Russian developers DTF Games, is a stand-alone game covering the advance toward and the battle for Stalingrad from both the German and Soviet sides. It was first released in December 2004, and then in the UK in March 2005. A Steam digital version was released in March 2015. It is unrelated to the similarly worded Great Battles: Stalingrad spin-off game from a different developer, built on the Blitzkrieg 2 engine and released in 2007.
Talvisota: Icy Hell, developed by Blitzfront Game Studio is a game based on the Finnish-Russian Winter War in 1939–1940. It was first released in November 2007.
WWI: The Great War, developed by Dark Fox, is a World War I-based game built on the Blitzkreg engine. The player assumes the role of the commanding officer of either the armed forces of the United Kingdom, France, Russia, Germany or Austria-Hungary on the battlefields of the Great War with the country's respective weaponry from 1914 to 1918. It was first released in June 2005, and an initial UK budget retail label was released in 2008. As of April 2015, the game is now officially available on Steam.
Mission Barbarossa and Kursk developed by UK developers ACTive Gaming, follows the invasion of the Soviet Union in 1941 and the Battle of Kursk in 1943. The Mission Barbarossa add-on is also known as Eastern Front in the Russian market. Mission Barbarossa and Kursk were first released in January 2005 (as a Russian budget label) and August 2005, respectively.
Blitzkrieg: Operation "North" developed by Dark Fox. Released in February 2004.
Panzerkrieg: Burning Horizon 2 developed by German studio La Plata Studios, who also made the official expansions Burning Horizon & Rolling Thunder. Burning Horizon II is an unofficial compilation of three previously released games in the series — Blitzkrieg: Red Horizon (Soviet), Blitzkrieg: Rolling Thunder (American), and Blitzkrieg: Lost Victories (German) and released in Germany in October 2008 and UK in June 2009. In the sequel, players can choose between the Allied, German or Soviet campaigns, reliving key battles from history such as the Battle of the Bulge, Operation Sturgeon Catch and Battle of the Frontiers.

Non-WWII or WWI based 
Conflict 2012: Operation Kosovo Sunrise developed by Patriote Interactive and La Plata Studios, who has experience in releasing unofficial add-ons. This game is set in 2012 in the Balkans as the players take command of a special mixed army unit in an attempt to stop invasion. The main factions are the NATO and Serbian forces. It was released in limited batches in Serbian/Cyrillic and/or maybe Russian language in October 2009. The English language retail version or patch also had a limited release around June 2010. The 2012 mod version is available at Mod DB.
Cuban Missile Crisis: The Aftermath, developed by G5 Software LLC. This game, built on the Enigma engine used by Blitzkrieg, provides a hypothetical scenario in which the 1962 Cuban Missile Crisis became a full-blown worldwide nuclear war. It was first released in Russia in February 2005 with some other European releases following later the same year. The US retail edition was first released in November 2005 and was digitally available on GamersGate in March 2008. The Russian developers also made a standalone expansion to this game called Cuban Missile Crisis: Ice Crusade, set in 1967, five years after the Cuban Missile Crisis which turned into a nuclear war. This expansion was first released in Russia in June 2005 and was digitally released on GamersGate in May 2009. Both games went on the Steam digital shop in March 2015.
Desert Law developed by Arise and used a modified version of Blitzkrieg's engine. It is a real-time strategy game set in the southern states of post-apocalyptic America, but without base building. The storytelling is told through comic book cutscenes as well as in-mission dialog. Mechanically, it is similar to Command & Conquer, and visually similar to the early Fallout games. It was first released in retail form in April 2005. It is also known Coyotes: Desert Law in Russia and Desert Law: Warriors of the Desert in Poland.Койоты. Закон пустыни вся информация об игре, читы, дата выхода, системные требования, купить игру Койоты. Закон пустыни It was digitally available on GamersGate in March 2008 and a Steam digital version was released in March 2015.
Cold War Conflicts, developed by Russian studios Fireglow Games and Red Ice software.

Panzerkrieg - Burning Horizon II
Hamburg-based La Plata Studios (developers of the Burning Horizon, Rolling Thunder and Green Devils titles) released Panzerkrieg - Burning Horizon II in 2008. The project was produced in conjunction with the head of the original Blitzkrieg team. By the end of October 2008, the game was released in Germany where it was very successful and sold more copies than any Blitzkrieg 2 extension.

References

2003 video games
1C Company games
Enigma Engine games
Lua (programming language)-scripted video games
MacOS games
Real-time tactics video games
Real-time strategy video games
Video games developed in Russia
Video games set in Belgium
Video games set in the Czech Republic
Video games set in Egypt
Video games set in Estonia
Video games set in Finland
Video games set in France
Video games set in Germany
Video games set in Hungary
Video games set in Italy
Video games set in Latvia
Video games set in Libya
Video games set in Luxembourg
Video games set in Papua New Guinea
Video games set in Poland
Video games set in Romania
Video games set in Russia
Video games set in Mongolia
Video games set in Morocco
Video games set in Myanmar
Video games set in Norway
Video games set in Sicily
Video games set in Singapore
Video games set in the Solomon Islands
Video games set in the Soviet Union
Video games set in Tunisia
Video games set in Ukraine
Video games with expansion packs
Video games with isometric graphics
Windows games
World War II video games
Pacific War video games
War video games set in the British Empire
CDV Software Entertainment games
Multiplayer and single-player video games